Bunyakiri is a town in Kalehe Territory, South Kivu, Democratic Republic of the Congo.It is mainly inhabited by Tembo, Havu, Twa and Hunde ethnic groups. People live mainly by doing agriculture and Fishery here. Others are skilled Hunters.

References

Populated places in South Kivu